Tommaso Perelli (1704–1783) was an Italian astronomer. Born into a noble family of Arezzo, Perelli was encouraged by his father to study law at the University of Pisa, but Guido Grandi (1671–1742), an abbot who was teaching mathematics there, steered him toward science. When his father died, Perelli abandoned the study of law for good. He decided to get a degree in physics and medicine. He studied astronomy and medicine at the University of Bologna, and Greek literature at the University of Padua. He was then appointed by the Tuscan government to the chair in astronomy at the University of Pisa, where he became a noted astronomer and hydraulics expert. He was the first to identify the hill of Arcetri, near Galileo's (1564–1642) last home, Villa Il Gioiello, as ideal location for astronomical observations.

List of works

See also
 List of astronomers

References

External links 

Italian scientific instrument makers
18th-century Italian astronomers
Academic staff of the University of Pisa
1704 births
1783 deaths
People from Arezzo